St Jude's (Irish: Naomh Jude) is a Gaelic Athletic Association club based in Templeogue on the southside of Dublin. The club fields teams in all four codes of the Gaelic Athletic Association Gaelic football, Hurling, Camogie and Ladies Football. Teams are fielded from Senior Grade right down to under eight level, the club also run a very popular academy which caters for children from four years of age to seven years of age and is open to all and free of charge.

Club history

The beginning

It was a great era for Football in Dublin way back in the 1970s. Heffos army was on the march. There were those remarkable battles with Mick ODwyer's legendary team of bachelors wearing the green and gold jerseys of Kerry. In the city and surrounds it became the thing to wear the navy and sky blue of Dublin.

New parishes were sprouting up everywhere in the suburbs. One such parish was Willington in Templeogue and it too became embroiled in the football fever.

Into this fever bed Bishop Galvin National School was born in 1975. There were 110 pupils in that opening year and the desire to play football and hurling was quite rampant among the kids. Internal leagues were introduced and these blossomed in the summer of 1977 into football being introduced into the Summer Project

It was on those balmy evenings at the Summer Project that St Judes G.A.A. Club was conceived. The birth finally took place at a meeting held in Bishop Galvin School on the evening of July 18, 1978 when a committee was appointed to look after the affairs of the new Cumann Peil Naomh Jude.

Ernest Kenny was elected as the first Chairman with Cyril Bates as Secretary and John Gallen as Treasurer.

In a matter of weeks the season and the new club were under way. Two teams were entered in the South East Leagues at Under 10 and Under 14 levels.

There was an encouraging start, both sides playing some fine football and holding their own in very competitive Leagues.

The Under 10 side under Jimmy ODwyer, Donncha O Liathain and Seamus Durkin actually did extremely well and finished third of ten teams in their division. The Under 14 mentors were Ernest Kenny, Fr Green and Charles Moran.

In those days St Judes were something of a nomadic outfit playing games wherever a pitch was available. Most of the home ties, though were played at Bushy Park and then later in Bancroft Park in Tallaght.

Progress was being made and the first honors to come to the new club was at Under 11A level in 1980 when the club celebrated victory in the South East League. It was at this stage that St Judes Club found a new permanent home in Tymon Park and with the acquisition of the playing fields there was a massive upsurge in interest and in the club's fortunes.

The number of teams was growing with each year, teams in all age groups, more than one team in some categories

And successes began to grow too. In 1981 our Under 10s won the South East League and the Under 12A side were runners up: in 1982 there was again success at Under 10 and the Under 12s finished third.

But the demands within the club were now growing also. A signal date in the history of the club arrived in February 1982 when a new Hurling and Camogie section was inaugurated and the name was officially changed to Cumann Luthcleas Gael Naomh Jude.

St Jude's football team is managed by Gareth Roche.

Building a Club

Achievements
 Dublin Senior Football Championship: Runners-Up 2009, 2018, 2021
 Dublin Senior Football League Division 1 Winners 2011
 Dublin Senior Hurling Championship: Runner -Up 2014, 2015
 Dublin Senior Hurling League: Winner 2014
 Dublin Senior B Hurling Championship: Winner 2007
 Dublin Intermediate Hurling Championship: Winner 2016
 Dublin Junior Hurling Championship: Winner 1989, 196, 2014
 Dublin Junior B Hurling Championship Winner 2002
 Dublin Junior C Hurling Championship Winner 1998, 2004
 Dublin Junior D Hurling Championship Winner 2016
 Dublin Minor C Hurling Championship Winners 2007
 Dublin Junior D Football Championship''' Winners 2003

Notable players 
Pat Spillane

Current
Danny Sutcliffe
Kevin McManamon
Brendan McManamon

Other
 Aodán Mac Suibhne

Current Executive

References

External links
St Jude's Official Website
Dublin Club GAA
club Flickr Site

Gaelic games clubs in South Dublin (county)
Templeogue